Keshod railway station  is a railway station serving in junagadh district of Gujarat State of India. It is under Bhavnagar railway division of Western Railway Zone of Indian Railways. Passenger, Express trains halt here.

Major trains 

Following major trains halt at Keshod railway station in both direction:

 19571/52 Rajkot - Porbandar Express (Via Jetalsar)
 19251/52 Somnath - Okha Express
 22957/58 Ahmedabad - Veraval Somnath Superfast Express
 19119/20 Ahmedabad - Somnath Intercity Express
 19569/70 Rajkot - Veraval Express
 11463/64 Somnath - Jabalpur Express (via Itarsi)
 11465/66 Somnath - Jabalpur Express (via Bina)
 16333/34 Thiruvananthapuram - Veraval Express
 11087/88 Veraval - Pune Express

References

Railway stations in Rajkot district
Bhavnagar railway division